Joane Cardinal-Schubert High School (JCS) is a public high school in Calgary, Alberta, Canada operated by the Calgary Board of Education. It was founded in 2018 and the first year of attendance was 1129 students. It has approximately 1,800 students and 60 staff members. It is named after the artist Joane Cardinal-Schubert. The school's mascot is a raven.

Academics 
Teaching and learning at Joane Cardinal-Schubert follows conventional classroom standards - students receive instruction in the classroom, and apply learned concepts through homework. Unlike the rest of the Calgary Board of Education, academic performance is determined through "outcome based reporting".

Advanced Placement (AP) 
Joane Cardinal-Schubert is advertised as an AP-offering school.

References

External links
Joane Cardinal-Schubert High School

High schools in Calgary
Educational institutions established in 2018
2018 establishments in Alberta